Cyperus tetraphyllus is a sedge endemic to Australia. This grass like plant is closely related to the papyrus. It grows to 50 cm high. The habitat is eastern Australia in high rainfall areas. Found in and near rainforest from Kiama north to Queensland.

Flowering occurs in spring and summer. The species name tetraphyllus literally means "four leaves", however, this plant is not clearly four leaved, and the meaning is obscure.

References

External links

tetraphyllus
Flora of New South Wales
Flora of Queensland
Plants described in 1810
Taxa named by Robert Brown (botanist, born 1773)